Otiorhynchus ligustici, known generally as the alfalfa snout beetle or lovage weevil, is a species of broad-nosed weevil in the family Curculionidae. It is found in North America and Europe.

References

Further reading

External links

 

Entiminae
Articles created by Qbugbot
Beetles described in 1758
Taxa named by Carl Linnaeus